John A. Hines (July 30, 1912 – December 11, 1966) was an American boxer who competed in the 1932 Summer Olympics.

He was born in Indiana and died in Los Angeles, California.

In 1932 he was eliminated in the quarter-finals of the featherweight class after losing his fight to the upcoming bronze medalist Allan Carlsson.

External links
profile

1912 births
1966 deaths
Boxers from Indiana
Featherweight boxers
Olympic boxers of the United States
Boxers at the 1932 Summer Olympics
American male boxers